Bruno Jacinto da Silva (born 21 August 1995), known as Bruno Paulista, is a Brazilian footballer who plays as a defensive midfielder. He is currently free agent.

Club career
Bruno Paulista was born in Nova Odessa, São Paulo, and graduated with Bahia's youth setup, after stints at São Paulo, Santo André and Ypiranga-BA. On 6 August 2014 he made his first-team debut, coming on as a late substitute in a 1–0 home win against Corinthians, for the season's Copa do Brasil.

Bruno Paulista made his Série A debut on 18 October, starting in a 1–2 away loss against São Paulo. On 10 February 2015 he renewed his link until 2018.

On 7 August 2015 Bruno Paulista moved to Sporting Clube de Portugal, signing a six-year deal.  Sporting paid €3.5 million for 65% of his rights, with a 45 million clause.

References

External links
 

Bruno Paulista at ZeroZero

1995 births
Living people
People from Nova Odessa
Brazilian footballers
Brazilian expatriate footballers
Association football midfielders
Campeonato Brasileiro Série A players
Campeonato Brasileiro Série B players
Primeira Liga players
Esporte Clube Bahia players
Sporting CP footballers
Sporting CP B players
CR Vasco da Gama players
Londrina Esporte Clube players
C.D. Fátima players
Footballers at the 2015 Pan American Games
Brazilian expatriate sportspeople in Portugal
Expatriate footballers in Portugal
Pan American Games bronze medalists for Brazil
Pan American Games medalists in football
Medalists at the 2015 Pan American Games
Footballers from São Paulo (state)